Proceedings of The Royal Society of Queensland is a multidisciplinary scientific journal published by The Royal Society of Queensland. It was established in 1884.

Volumes of the journal are typically published annually, although this schedule has varied over time as the resources of The Royal Society of Queensland have allowed. Volume 131 is currently in preparation and is scheduled for print-publication in December 2022.

While the scope of The Royal Society of Queensland encompasses all of science, including the social sciences that follow scientific method, the scope of the journal is more limited, being restricted to the natural sciences and observations about natural resources and the environment from within other disciplines. However, 'natural sciences' is itself interpreted broadly and also, the journal publishes papers on science policy, science education and science opinion.

All papers are single-blind peer-reviewed.

Value of local and regional journals

The 2021 Honorary Editor, Dr Julien Louys of Griffith University, published a strong defence of regional journals like the Proceedings in his Editorial Foreword to Volume 129:

"The science reported in the following pages represents strong observational data, rigorous interpretations, and discourse that will resonate well beyond the state. Nevertheless, there is a wide-ranging perception, increasingly common across universities and funding bodies, that science should only be published in flashy, high-profile, or international publications. Unfortunately, excellent publications such as the Proceedings are not seen as desirable or even worthwhile venues to submit science. It has even reached the point where academics have been actively discouraged from publishing in more local or regional journals, being informed that such publications would detract from their professional records...

"Such journals provide one of the few remaining outlets for purely local or small-scale scientific observations. This scale may be small from a topical or geographical perspective but can be enormous from a scientific perspective. The grand narratives, the meta-analyses, and the increasingly popular ‘big data’ driven research agendas do not occur in isolation but critically rely on local observations and smaller-scale studies…

"The Great Barrier Reef, one of the natural wonders of the world…is composed of thousands of individual reefs, each in turn composed of billions of coral polyps, each building on the structures left by previous polyps. In much the same way do scientific contributions build upon one another, dependent on the small, local and (according to some) seemingly insignificant outputs."

Special Issues

In addition to the annual Proceedings of The Royal Society of Queensland, the Society has also published a number of special editions on topics of scientific and community interest at the time:

1976 The Border Ranges: A Land Use Conflict in Regional Perspective

1980 Contemporary Cape York Peninsula

1981 Public Information: Your Right to Know

1984 The Brigalow Belt of Australia

1984 The Capricorn Section of the Great Barrier Reef: Past, Present and Future

1984 Focus on Stradbroke: New Information on North Stradbroke Island and Surrounding Areas, 1974–1984

1986 The Mulga Lands

1989 Rural Queensland: A Sustainable Future: The Application of Geographic Information Systems to Land Planning and Management

1995 Queensland: the State of Science

2002 Landscape Health of Queensland

2006 Bushfire 2006 Conference (Vol. 115)

2011 A Place of Sandhills: Ecology, Hydrogeomorphology and Management of Queensland’s Dune Islands (Vol. 117)

2020 The Land of Clouds Revisited: The Biodiversity and Ecology of the Eungella Rainforests (Vol. 125)

2020 Springs of the Great Artesian Basin (Vol. 126)

2020 A Rangelands Dialogue: Towards a Sustainable Future (Vol. 127).

Digitisation

In 2014, The Royal Society of Queensland undertook a major project to digitise all past issues of the Proceedings, the Transactions of the Philosophical Society of Queensland, special editions, and a range of assorted historical records. This digitisation effort aims to make this scientifically and historically valuable collection more accessible to scientists, historians and the public generally. Full text search capability is now available back to Volume 1, although issues after 1956 are behind a paywall and the scanned text is yet to be rectified.

In December 2019, the Society resolved to publish the Proceedings online with open access, commencing with Volume 124. In 2021, it added DOI references (prefix 10.53060).

Honorary Editors

2018 Dr Barry Pollock

2019 Ms Revel Pointon, Dr Ross Hynes, Dr Geoff Edwards

2020 Em. Prof Angela Arthington

2021 A/Prof Julien Louys

2022. Dr Justyna Miszkiewicz

References

External links 
 National Library's Trove index
 State Library of Queensland catalogue
 Biodiversity Heritage Library's holdings
 

Multidisciplinary scientific journals
Science and technology in Australia
Publications established in 1885
English-language journals
1885 establishments in Australia
Royal Society of Queensland